San Diego Zest FC Women is an American soccer team in San Diego, California, United States. The club was founded in 2017 and is owned and operated by San Diego Sports Authority, a sports management company. Zest FC Women will compete in the Women's Premier Soccer League starting in 2018.

History 
San Diego Zest FC Women was founded as an extension of its parent club, San Diego Zest FC, which competes in the Premier Development League and its brother team, San Diego Zest FC 2, which competes in the United Premier Soccer League. On May 22, 2017, the Women's Premier Soccer League announced that it had awarded the franchise to San Diego Zest Women.

References

External links 
 San Diego Zest FC Women Official Website
 San Diego Zest FC (Premier Development League)

Zest
Women's Premier Soccer League teams
Women's soccer clubs in California
Association football clubs established in 2017
2017 establishments in California